Penycae Football Club is a Welsh football club based in Pen-y-cae, Wrexham whose first team currently plays in the Ardal Leagues North East. Following on from the growth of the club over recent years, Penycae Football Club is now a registered business and will now operate as Penycae Football Club C.I.C (Community Interest Company) going forward. This ensures that the long term future of the club is protected and everything that has been built since 1982 is secured for future generations. The club also has a team which acts as a pathway to the first team known as the Reserve team. The club run a number of youth teams for 10- to 15-year-olds, and mini teams for children under 10 years of age. A new 'Mini Kickerz' club is being established beginning of Summer 2019, for kids aged 4 and 5.

In June 2019, the club struck a major sponsorship deal, the biggest ever in the club's history, with soccer million,  which included naming rights of the clubs Riverside stadium, the main stand, advertising hoardings around the pitch and back of shirt sponsorship.

History 
Pen-y-cae Football Club has continued in its tradition of growth and development from its humble beginnings in 1982. The club continues to strive to provide an inclusive sport for those who reside within the parish of Pen-y-cae, but also welcomes others from the surrounding communities.

In 2005 the football club secured the lease on their Afoneitha ground. The club played in the Huws Gray Cymru Alliance from 2010 until 2015, despite being in 4th position in November.  In March 2020 all football ceased owing to the Covid 19 pandemic. This was to be the last season under the Welsh National League umbrella, thus handing over league control to newly named FAW Ardal Leagues. Cae will find themselves in 20/21 (covid dependent) in a league along with Corwen, Cefn Albion, Chirk AAA and Rhos Aelwyd, and also containing teams from mid and west wales in a new structure shake up.

The SoccerMillion Riverside Arena 
After securing the lease in 2005 the club began to develop the ground and has to date secured the facility with palisade fencing, added hard standing to all four sides of the pitch, a stand on one side (The Kenny Morris Memorial Stand) which provides covered accommodation for up to 150 , two brick dugout areas which can seat up to 7 people, opened a clubhouse which can cater for up to 100 people, added a building adjacent to the clubhouse which house's toilets for gents, women/disabled along with a new kitchen, an outside seating area and upgraded the original pavilion which now has two changing rooms which can accommodate up to 20 players, an LPG shower system and extra spectator toilets. 

In June 2019, as part of the sponsorship deal with SoccerMillion, the Riverside was renamed The SoccerMillion Riverside Arena.

The Karl Thomas Memorial Hall 
In October 2011 the club were offered a portable building that had been previously used as classrooms in Rhosymedre School free of charge with the only cost being the transporting of the building to the grounds. However, not being in a financial position to afford this offer the club approached members of Karl's family to see if it was possible to release some money from the jointly run memorial fund to finance the project. They agreed with the aim of not only turning the building into a facility that all sections of the club could use but more importantly to name the building after him.

With the support and generosity of many local companies, plus a huge amount of fundraising the club were in a position to open the building and on Sunday, 28 April 2013, it was officially opened and named "The Karl Thomas Memorial Hall" by Karl's mother Heulwen, sisters Sharon and Debbie and Susan Elan Jones, MP for South Clwyd.

In November 2016 the club undertook the task of trying to secure not only a full license but also to have the hiring restrictions lifted on the building to enable the general public to hire the facility. Following months of meetings, negotiations and expense the club in April 2017 were pleased to announce that "The Karl Thomas Memorial Hall" had now been awarded a full license and had the restrictions lifted. Special thanks to Huw Perkins of Wrexham council, John Phillips of Penycae Council and the local residents for their support.

The clubhouse can accommodate up to 80 people, has Lager and Cider on draught as well as various bottles plus it also has Sky and BT sports.

The Stuart Griffiths Hospitality Suite 
This building was originally used as a catering van for match days and after its relocation due to the extension on the clubhouse it was decided to try and turn it into a spectator/sponsor facility. It is used for match sponsors and to provide any spectators with disabilities or additional needs some comfort.

The building was officially opened by Councillor John Phillips on Sunday 27 January 2019 and named in honour of club stalwart and Chairman "Stuart Griffiths" who has been a huge part of Penycae Football Club since its inception in 1982.

Bando's 
In October 2016 the club took possession of and old portable building and began the task of turning it into a facility to house new toilets for gents and women/disabled along with a new kitchen and a first aid/office room. After 8 months of fundraising and obtaining grants along with the help and support they received from local companies and individuals the building was finished in April 2017. It was officially opened by Councillor John Phillips on Friday 5 May 2017, the building was named 'Bandos' in honour of David Lovell.

Current Management Staff 
First Team Manager - Leighton Edwards 

First Team Assistant Manager - 

First Team Coach - Matt Griffiths 

Reserve Team Manager  -  Craig Gardner 

Physiotherapist: Mark Waters (Student Physiotherapist)

Current squad 20/21 
GK

DARLINGTON, Ben 

WILLIAMS, Stuart 

DF

MAZZARELLA, Josh

SCOTT, Jac

SCOTT, Wil

THOMAS, Dyfan

SMITH, Harry

COTTERILL, Sean

JONES, Ben

DAVIES, Kyle

CIFTCI, Polat

MD

ROWLANDS, Alex

WILLIAMS, Jordan

WILLIAMS, Luke

SCOTT, Matthew

JOHNSON, Olly

MORRIS, Les

JOHNSON, Oliver

BOWEN, Harry

PETERS, Adam

DAVIS, Ben

FOR

OWEN, Austin

EDWARDS, Brandon

DAVIES, Zac

JONES, Ryan

JONES, Jaden

Honours
Welsh National League (Wrexham Area) Premier Division Champions: 1993–94, 2010–11
Welsh National League (Wrexham Area) Premier Division Runners Up: 2000–01, 2001–02, 2002–03, 2003–04, 2008–09
Welsh National League (Wrexham Area) Division 1 Runners Up: 1984–85
Welsh National League (Wrexham Area) Division 3 Champions: 1983–84
Welsh National League (Wrexham Area) Division 4 Runners Up: 1982–83
North East Wales FA Junior (Horace Wynne) Cup Winners: 1982–83, 1983–84, 1984—85
North East Wales Football Association Challenge Cup Finalists: 1997–98 
Welsh National League (Wrexham Area) Division 3 Cup Winners: 1983–84 
Welsh National League (Wrexham Area) Division 4 Cup Finalists: 1982–83
Welsh National League (Wrexham Area) Reserve / Colts Division League Cup Winners: 2018-19
Welsh National League (Wrexham Area) Reserve / Colts Division Runners Up: 2018-19
Dave Bennett Premier Division Cup Winners: 1993–94
Cymru Alliance Cup Runners Up: 1996–97 
FAW Welsh Trophy Winners: 2003–04
FAW Welsh Trophy Runners Up: 2008–09
Presidents Cup Runners Up: 2011–12

References

External links
 official website
 Club website
 Welsh National League website

Football clubs in Wales
Welsh National League (Wrexham Area) Premier Division clubs
Football clubs in Wrexham
Sport in Wrexham County Borough
Association football clubs established in 1982
1982 establishments in Wales
Cymru Alliance clubs
Ardal Leagues clubs